Life Imitating Life  is the fourth studio album by the American rock band Augustana, released on  April 22, 2014 via Razor & Tie. The album features Sarab Singh on drums, all  other instruments were recorded by Dan Layus.

Track listing

References

2014 albums
Augustana (band) albums
Razor & Tie albums